Milija is a masculine name of Serbian origin that is a form of the name Milan.  It comes from the Slavic element milu meaning "gracious, dear". Milijana is the feminine form.

 Milija Aleksic (1951–2012), English footballer
 Milija and Pavle Bakić, Turkish footballers
 Milija Brkić (born 1954), Serbian footballer
 Milija Jovanović (born 1953), Serbian politician
 Milija Marković (1812-1877), Serbian painter and priest
 Milija Miković (born 1994), Montenegrin basketball player
 Milija Miletić (born 1968), Serbian politician
 Milija Mrdak (born 1991), Serbian volleyball player 
 Milija Zdravković (1765–1814) Serbian politician
 Milija Žižić (born 1979), Serbian footballer

Milijana
 Milijana Maganjić (born 1981), Croatian basketball player
 Milijana Nikolic (born 1975), Serbian-Australian opera singer
 Milijana Sakić (born 1988), Serbian politician

See also
 Milia (disambiguation)
 Milan (given name)

References